The Dead and the Others is a 2018 internationally co-produced drama film directed by João Salaviza and Renée Nader Messora. It was screened in the Un Certain Regard section at the 2018 Cannes Film Festival, where it won the Jury Prize.

References

External links

2018 films
2018 drama films
Brazilian drama films
Portuguese drama films
2010s Portuguese-language films